Chris Grismer is a Canadian director and producer of film, television and music videos, now residing in Los Angeles.  His credits include Designated Survivor, Killjoys, The Vampire Diaries, The Originals, The Nine Lives of Chloe King, Playmakers, This Is Wonderland, Queer As Folk, Pretty Little Liars, Deputy and Prodigal Son. As a music video director, he has directed videos for Arcade Fire, Broken Social Scene, Metric, Stars, Death From Above 1979, Magneta Lane, The Fembots and Motion City Soundtrack. He was nominated for a Gemini Award in 2009 for his work on Being Erica.

References

External links

Canadian emigrants to the United States
Canadian film directors
Canadian music video directors
Canadian television directors
Living people
Place of birth missing (living people)
Year of birth missing (living people)